Hemiramphidae is a family of fishes that are commonly called halfbeaks, spipe fish or spipefish. They are a geographically widespread and numerically abundant family of epipelagic fish inhabiting warm waters around the world.  The halfbeaks are named for their distinctive jaws, in which the lower jaws are significantly longer than the upper jaws. The similar viviparous halfbeaks (family Zenarchopteridae) have often been included in this family.

Though not commercially important themselves, these forage fish support artisanal fisheries and local markets worldwide. They are also fed upon by other commercially important predatory fishes, such as billfishes, mackerels, and sharks.

Taxonomy
In 1758, Carl Linnaeus was the first to scientifically describe a halfbeak, Esox brasiliensis (now Hemiramphus brasiliensis). In 1775 Peter Forsskål described two more species as Esox, Esox far and Esox marginatus. It was not until 1816 that Georges Cuvier created the genus Hemiramphus; from then on, all three were classified as Hemiramphus. In 1859, Gill erected Hemiramphidae, deriving its name from Hemiramphus, the family's type genus. The name comes from the Greek hemi, meaning half, and rhamphos, meaning beak or bill.

There are currently eight genera within the family Hemirampphidae:

 Arrhamphus Günther, 1866
 Chriodorus Goode & Bean, 1882
 Euleptorhamphus Gill, 1859
 Hemiramphus Cuvier, 1816
 Hyporhamphus Gill, 1859
 Melapedalion Fowler, 1934
 Oxyporhamphus Gill, 1864
 Rhynchorhamphus Fowler, 1928

This family is primarily marine and found in the Atlantic, Pacific, and Indian Oceans, though some inhabit estuaries and rivers.

Evolution
The halfbeaks' fossil record extends into the Lower Tertiary. The earliest known halfbeak is Brachyrhamphus bolcensis from the Eocene at Monte Bolca, Italy. Apart from differences in the length of the upper and lower jaws, recent and fossil halfbeaks are distinguished by the fusion of the third pair of upper pharyngeal bones into a plate.

Phylogeny

The phylogeny of the halfbeaks is in a state of flux.

On the one hand, there is little question that they are most closely related to three other families of streamlined, surface water fishes: the flyingfishes, needlefishes, and sauries. Traditionally, these four families have been taken to together comprise the order Beloniformes. The halfbeaks and flyingfishes are considered to form one group, the superfamily Exocoetoidea, and the needlefishes and sauries another, the superfamily Scomberesocoidea.

On the other hand, recent studies have demonstrated that rather than forming a single monophyletic group (a clade), the halfbeak family actually includes a number of lineages ancestral to the flyingfishes and the needlefishes. In other words, as traditionally defined, the halfbeak family is paraphyletic.

Within the subfamily Hemiramphinae, the "flying halfbeak" genus Oxyporhamphus has proved to be particularly problematic; while morphologically closer to the flyingfishes, molecular evidence places it with Hemiramphus and Euleptorhamphus. Together, these three genera form the sister group to the flyingfish family. The other two hemiramphine genera Hyporhamphus and Arrhamphus form another clade of less clear placement.

Rather than being closely related to the flyingfishes, the subfamily Zenarchopterinae appears to be the sister group of the needlefishes and sauries. This is based on the pharyngeal jaw apparatus, sperm ultrastructure, and molecular evidence. However, this hypothesis has awkward implications for how the morphological evolution of the group is understood, because the fused pharyngeal plate has been considered reliably diagnostic of the halfbeak family. Furthermore, the existing theory that because juvenile needlefish pass through a developmental stage where the lower jaw is longer than the upper jaw (the so-called "halfbeak stage") the theory that halfbeaks are paedomorphic needlefish is untenable. In fact the unequal lengths of the upper and lower jaws of halfbeaks appears to be the basal condition, with needlefish being relatively derived in comparison.

Morphology

The halfbeaks are elongate, streamlined fish adapted to living in open water. Halfbeaks can grow to over  SL in the case of Euleptorhampus viridis. The scales are relatively large, cycloid (smooth), and easily detached. There are no spines in the fins. A distinguishing characteristic is that the third pair of upper pharyngeal bones are anklylosed (fused) into a plate. Halfbeaks are one of several fish families that lack a stomach, all of which possess a pharyngeal jaw apparatus (pharyngeal mill). Most species have an extended lower jaw, at least as juveniles, though this feature may be lost as the fish mature, as with Chriodorus, for example.

As is typical for surface dwelling, open water fish, most species are silvery, darker above and lighter below, an example of countershading. The tip of the lower jaw is bright red or orange in most species.

Halfbeaks carry several adaptations to feeding at the water surface. The eyes and nostrils are at the top of the head and the upper jaw is mobile, but not the lower jaw. Combined with their streamlined shape and the concentration of fins towards the back (similar to that of a pike), these adaptations allow halfbeaks to locate, catch, and swallow food items very effectively.

Range and habitat

Halfbeaks inhabit warm seas, predominantly at the surface, in the Atlantic, Indian, and Pacific oceans. A small number are found in estuaries.  Most species of marine halfbeaks are known from continental coastlines, but some extend into the western and central Pacific, and one species (Hyporhamphus ihi) is endemic to New Zealand. Hemiramphus is a worldwide marine genus.

Ecology and behavior

Feeding
Marine halfbeaks are omnivores feeding on algae; marine plants such as seagrasses; plankton; invertebrates such as pteropods and crustaceans; and smaller fishes. For some subtropical species at least, juveniles are more predatory than adults. Some tropical species feed on animals during the day and plants at night, while other species alternate between carnivory in the summer and herbivory in the winter. They are in turn eaten by many ecologically and commercially important fish, such as billfish, mackerel, and sharks, and so are a key link between trophic levels.

Behavior
Marine halfbeaks are typically pelagic schooling forage fish. These fish school near the surface at night but swim closer to the sea floor during the day, particularly among beds of seagrasses. Genetic analysis of the different sub-populations of the eastern sea garfish Hyporhamphus melanochir in South Australian coastal waters reveals that there is a small but consistent migration of individuals among theme, sufficient to keep them genetically homogeneous.

Some marine halfbeaks, including Euleptorhamphus velox and Euleptorhamphus viridis, are known for their ability to jump out of the water and glide over the surface for considerable distances, and have consequently sometimes been called flying halfbeaks.

Reproduction
Hemiramphidae species are all external fertilizers. They are usually egg-layers and often produce relatively small numbers of fairly large eggs for fish of their size, typically in shallow coastal waters, such as the seagrass meadows of Florida Bay. The eggs of Hemiramphus brasiliensis and H. balao are typically  in diameter and have attaching filaments.

Relatively little is known about the ecology of juvenile marine halfbeaks, though estuarine habitats seem to be favored by at least some species.

Relationship to humans

Halfbeak fisheries
Halfbeaks are not a major target for commercial fisheries, though small fisheries for them exist in some places, for example in South Australia where fisheries target the southern sea garfish (Hyporhamphus melanochir). and the eastern sea garfish (Hyporhamphus australis). Halfbeaks are caught by a variety of methods including seines and pelagic trawls, dip-netting under lights at night, and with haul nets. They are utilized fresh, dried, smoked, or salted, and they are considered good eating. However, even where halfbeaks are targeted by fisheries, they tend to be of secondary importance compared with other edible fish species.

In some localities significant bait fisheries exist to supply sport fishermen. One study of a bait fishery in Florida that targets Hemiramphus brasiliensis and Hemiramphus balao suggests that despite increases in the size of the fishery the population is stable and the annual catch is valued at around $500,000.

See also

 USS Halfbeak (SS-352) American submarine named after these fish

References

Beloniformes
 
Fish of Hawaii
Extant Eocene first appearances
Paraphyletic groups